Jerry Dowling is a Canadian-born American cartoonist who has also worked in newspaper illustration.  He received the National Cartoonist Society Newspaper Illustration Award for 1994 for his work.

Dowling worked for the Cincinnati Enquirer from the late 1960s to 1994. He continued to do sports cartoons for the Cincinnati alternative weekly CityBeat, for 12 years. Dowling often puts a little rodent (called Dirty Rat) at the bottom of his cartoons. The rodent always has something to say.
He was known for cartoons of former Cincinnati Reds owner Marge Schott with ever-increasing numbers of cigarettes hanging from her mouth.

Jerry's Book, Drawing Pete was released by Edgecliff Press in 2008. The book is a collection from his 40 years of drawings of Cincinnati Reds player, Pete Rose. He has four other books published - DRAWING SUPER WARS (Cincinnati Bengals history), DRAWING THE BIG RED MACHINE (Cincinnati Reds teams), DRAWING THE HOLLYWOOD WALK OF FAME, and DRAWING THE GRAND OLE COUNTRY. All can be purchased at his website jerryjdowling.com.

He presently does numerous gift illustrations.

References

External links 
 NCS Awards
 Drawing Pete

American cartoonists
Living people
The Cincinnati Enquirer people
Year of birth missing (living people)